Diêu Trì is a town of Tuy Phước District, in Bình Định Province, Vietnam. It had a population of 11,671 in 1999.

Diêu Trì is most noted for the Diêu Trì Railway Station on the North–South Railway (Reunification Express) which connects by a branch line to Quy Nhơn Railway Station and the city of Quy Nhơn, population of 250,000 people, ten kilometres to the east. The history of the town is closely linked with the building of railways in Vietnam, and during the French colonial period the rail yards were a target for the leafleting by independence activists.

References

Populated places in Bình Định province
Townships in Vietnam